Berroa is a surname. Notable people with the surname include:

Ángel Berroa (born 1977), Dominican baseball coach and former player
Billy Berroa (1928–2007), Dominican broadcaster
Catalina Berroa (1849–1911), Cuban pianist, music teacher, and composer
Emilio Berroa (born 1946), Dominican weightlifter
Federico Martínez Berroa (born 1996), Uruguayan footballer
Gerónimo Berroa (born 1965), Dominican baseball player 
Ignacio Berroa (born 1953), Cuban jazz drummer
José Manuel Jiménez Berroa (1851–1917), Cuban pianist and composer
Rei Berroa (1914–2000), Dominican-American poet, university professor, literary and cultural critic, and translator